"Freaky" (stylized as FREAKY) is the 36th single by Japanese singer Koda Kumi, released on June 27, 2007. The single took the #1 spot on the Oricon charts, making it her fourth #1 single, and charted for fifteen weeks.

Information
"Freaky" is Japanese R&B-turned-pop star Kumi Koda's thirty-sixth single under the Avex sub-label Rhythm Zone. It charted #1 on the Oricon Singles Charts, making it her fourth to do - the others being you, feel and Yume no Uta/futari de.... It remained on the charts for fifteen weeks with over 250,000 shipped. "Freaky," the title track, was certified platinum for downloads by RIAJ.

The single came in CD and CD+DVD, with limited editions for both. The limited editions contained a fold-out promotional poster. The CD+DVD version harbored instrumentals for the four tracks on the single, while the CD only carried remixes.

While the song contained four separate tracks, it was only listed as a double a-side, due to "Sora" and "girls" not having corresponding music videos and being listed as b-sides. On the corresponding album for the single, Kingdom; however, "Run For Your Life" was omitted from the CD portion.

Initially, "Run For Your Life" was not going to be on the single and, instead, would have been the song "anytime," which was released as a single seven months later. This is most apparent in the music video, whereas both "Run For Your Life" and "anytime" were filmed at the same location in California. A reason for the switch was never released, though fans speculated it was to give Kumi a ballad to be released during the winter months, whereas Ai no Uta was released in early Autumn.

Promotions
"Freaky" was used as the song to advertise Honda's Honda ZEST SPORTS vehicle.

"Sora" (空 / Sky) was used as the television advertisement for Toshiba's mobile fanfun SoftBank 815T.

"Run For Your Life" was used to advertise makeup company KOSE's new Visee line.

"girls" was used as the theme song for Koda Kumi's new pachinko game SANKYO FEVER LIVE IN HALL.

Packaging
Freaky was released in four editions, two regular editions and two first press editions:

CD: contains eight musical tracks - four songs with instrumentals for each song.
CD [First Press Edition]: contains eight musical tracks - four songs with remixes for each song.
CD+DVD: contains eight musical tracks - four songs with instrumentals for each song - with two music videos and two making videos.
CD+DVD [First Press Edition]: contains eight musical tracks - four songs with remixes for each song - with two music videos and two making videos.

First Press editions of both the CD and CD+DVD versions contained a foldout promotional poster.

Track listing
(Source)

CD only

CD+DVD

Charts
Oricon Sales Chart (Japan)

Alternate Versions
FREAKY
FREAKY: Found on the single (2007) and corresponding album Kingdom (2008)
FREAKY [Surtek Collective's Action Remix featuring Peter Rap]: Found on the CD only version of the single (2007)
FREAKY [Instrumental]: Found on the CD+DVD version of the single (2007)
FREAKY [Caramel Pod Remix]: Found on Koda Kumi Driving Hit's 3 (2011)
FREAKY [MATZ Remix]: Found on Koda Kumi Driving Hit's 8 (2018)

Sora
Sora: Found on the single (2007)
Sora [Yukihiro Fukutomi Remix]: Found on the CD only version of the single (2007) and Koda Kumi Driving Hit's (2009)
Sora [Instrumental]: Found on the CD+DVD version of the single (2007)

Run For Your Life
Run For Your Life: Found on the single (2007)
Run For Your Life [ Kaskade Remix]: Found on the CD only version of the single (2007) and Koda Kumi Driving Hit's (2009)
Run For Your Life [Instrumental]: Found on the CD+DVD version of the single (2007)

girls
girls: Found on the single (2007)
girls [CUBISMO GRAPHICO Beach Girls MIX]: Found on the CD only version of the single (2007)
girls [Instrumental]: Found on the CD+DVD version of the single (2007)
girls [TAKAROT "TOKYO FANTASTIC" Remix]: Found on Koda Kumi Driving Hit's 6 (2014)

References

2006 singles
2006 songs
Koda Kumi songs
Oricon Weekly number-one singles
Rhythm Zone singles
Songs written by Koda Kumi
Songs written by Tommy Henriksen